Baqeleh may refer to:
 Baqeleh, Kermanshah
 Baqeleh, Harsin, Kermanshah Province
 Baqeleh-ye Olya, Kermanshah Province
 Baqeleh-ye Sofla, Kermanshah Province

See also
 Baqleh